John White Bower (December 7, 1808 – January 13, 1850) was a Texas settler, signatory to the Texas Declaration of Independence, member of the House of Representatives for the Republic of Texas, and Judge.

References

External links
BOWER, JOHN WHITE the Texas State Historical Association

1808 births
People from Talbotton, Georgia
1850 deaths
People of the Texas Revolution
Signers of the Texas Declaration of Independence